Poggiolo may refer to;

 Poggiolo, Corse-du-Sud, a commune in Corse-du-Sud, France
 Poggiolo (stream), a small coastal stream in Haute-Corse, France
 Monte Poggiolo, a hill near Forlì, Italy in the Emilia-Romagna area